The Hemiphacidiaceae are a family of fungi in the order Helotiales. Although the type genus was originally Hemiphacidium, it has since been renamed to Sarcotrochila.  The 26 species in this family are limited in distribution to northern temperate zones.

References

Helotiales
Ascomycota families